Dupatta is a 1970 Indian Punjabi-language film directed by Mohinder Wahi, starring Ravinder Kapoor, Indira Billi, Joy Mukherjee, Sunder, and Sonia Sahni.

Music 

Sapan Jagmohan composed the music for playback singers Mohammad Rafi, Mahendra Kapoor and Asha Bhosle. Varma Malik wrote the lyrics.

References 

1970 films
Indian black-and-white films
Films set in Punjab, India
Punjabi-language Indian films
1970s Punjabi-language films